Anagrama is a Spanish publisher founded in 1969 by Jorge Herralde. In 2010 it was sold to the Italian publisher Feltrinelli.

Since 1969, Anagrama has published over 3,500 titles. currently, Anagrama publishes around 100 books annually, between the fiction series, non-fiction series and a paperback series.

The most important of the collections it publishes is Narrativas hispánicas, consisting of works by many of the most important Spanish-language writers of the modern era, including Sergio Pitol, Enrique Vila-Matas, Roberto Bolaño, Álvaro Enrigue, Ricardo Piglia, Javier Tomeo, Álvaro Pombo, among others. It also publishes Panaromas de narrativas, which consists of prominent works translated from other languages, and Argumentos, or essays by all types of thinkers, philosophers, and contemporary writers.

The publisher gives two awards annually to unpublished works, the Anagrama Essay Prize and the Herralde Novel Prize.

The publisher and its translators have been criticized by Latin American readers for the overuse of typically Castilian Spanish expressions, although one critic, acknowledging the issue, noted that 75% of its sales are made in Spain.

«Llibres anagrama», the Catalan language series, was created in 2014 and in 2016, the premi Llibres anagrama was awarded for the first time, for original fiction written in the Catalan language. Since January 2017, the Feltrinelli Group is the new owner, Jorge Herralde is chairman of the board and Silvia Sesé has taken over as anagrama's new Editorial Director.

References

External links
 

Book publishing companies of Spain
Publishing companies established in 1969